The Best Summer of My Life is a 2018 Spanish comedy film directed by Dani de la Orden starring Leo Harlem, Toni Acosta, Maggie Civantos and Jordi Sánchez together with Alejandro Serrano and Stephanie Gil. It is a remake of the 2013 Italian film Sole a catinelle.

Plot 
Curro, a salesman, is a scoundrel with a heart of gold who promises his son Nico a holidays that he is not able to afford.

Reparto

Production 
Consisting of a remake of the 2013 Italian film Sole a catinelle (written by Gennaro Nunziante and Checco Zalone), the screenplay of The Best Summer of My Life was written by Dani de la Orden, Marta Suárez, Daniel Castro and Olatz Arroyo. Valentín Álvarez was charged with the cinematography whereas Zacarías M. de la Riva authored the score. Produced by Álamo Audiovisual, A.I.E., Atresmedia Cine, S.L. and Álamo Producciones Audiovisuales, S.L., the film was primarily shot in the island of Tenerife, the province of Toledo, Arganda del Rey and Aluche. Tenerife was used to primarily portray the fictional setting in Marbella. Only two brief aerial shots actually correspond to the latter city.

Release 
The film was presented at the 21st Málaga Spanish Film Festival (FCME) on 21 April 2018. Distributed by A Contracorriente Films, the film was theatrically released on 12 July 2018. The Best Summer of My Life became the third best performing Spanish film at the domestic box office in 2018, grossing circa €8 million.

Reception 
Raquel Hernández Luján of HobbyConsolas gave the film 78 out of 100 points, considering it to be "a fresh and white comedy, tremendously well-intentioned", highlighting Leo Harlem's performance as well as the supporting cast while negatively assessing the overly "childish" and "dumbish" dramatic side.

Manuel J. Lombardo of Diario de Sevilla wrote that the film encapsulates the comedic performance of Leo Harlem within a bland format displaying a "shameful plot" and "shoddy forms" making "any complicity with the proposal literally impossible".

Pere Vall of Fotogramas gave the film 3 out of 5 stars, highlighting Leo Harlem's performance.

Toni Vall of Cinemanía gave the film 2 out of 5 stars, writing that despite being "well directed", the film was at the service of a "forgetful insubstantiality" and that it was particularly "innocuous".

See also 
 List of Spanish films of 2018

References 
Citations

Bibliography
 

Films set in Andalusia
Films shot in the Canary Islands
2010s Spanish-language films
2018 films
2018 comedy films
Spanish remakes of Italian films
Spanish comedy films
Films about vacationing
Atresmedia Cine films
2010s Spanish films